Kevin Gerard Schmidt (born August 16, 1988) is an American actor, known best for his role as Henry Baker in Cheaper by the Dozen and Cheaper by the Dozen 2 and as Noah Newman in The Young and the Restless. Schmidt also played Ryan in Alvin and the Chipmunks: The Squeakquel and starred on Cartoon Network's first live-action scripted television series, Unnatural History. Schmidt also co-created, starred in, produced, and directed a cult web-series, Poor Paul. Schmidt continues to write, direct, and act, and also served as president of the Conscious Human Initiative, a non-profit organization that sought to reduce malnutrition worldwide.

Life and career
Schmidt was born in Andover, Kansas. His brother is musician and actor Kendall Schmidt.

At first, Schmidt did not plan to work in the entertainment industry. As a football player and a student, Schmidt was uninterested in acting but was persuaded to start auditioning after his two brothers, Kenneth and Kendall, found success as actors in Los Angeles, California. Schmidt was ten years old when he began to book a string of guest-starring roles and appeared on a number of prime time television shows including NCIS, Bones, Without a Trace, CSI: NY, Curb Your Enthusiasm and Monk. Schmidt also found success on the big screen. In addition to his role in Cheaper by the Dozen and its sequel, Schmidt co-starred with Ashton Kutcher in The Butterfly Effect and Kristen Stewart in Catch That Kid. Schmidt transitioned to leading roles, starring in Resurrection Mary and Alvin and the Chipmunks: The Squeakquel.

Having undergone his own personal weight loss at age 17, Schmidt shared what he had learned about fitness and health on his screenwriting and directorial debut project entitled The Alyson Stoner Project. Teaming up with friend and Cheaper by the Dozen co-star Alyson Stoner, the pair produced an instructional musical and fitness hybrid that uses the latest dance moves as a method of exercise. The project was intended to teach children the importance of fitness, nutrition, and making good lifestyle choices.

In addition, Schmidt is in production on The Great Migration, an animated film which he wrote; he is producing the film alongside Rob Minkhoff, director of the Disney film The Lion King. The film stars his younger brother, Kendall, along with Logan Henderson, Ashley Tisdale, Vanessa Hudgens, and Ashley Benson.

Schmidt is an advocate for sustainable farming methods such as aquaponics and hopes to aid in ending malnutrition and obesity worldwide.

Filmography

References

External links
 

1988 births
Male actors from Kansas
American male child actors
American male film actors
American Internet celebrities
American male television actors
Living people
People from Andover, Kansas
Video bloggers
21st-century American male actors
Male bloggers